The Mixed 10 m platform synchro competition of the 2016 European Aquatics Championships was held on 14 May 2016.

Results
The final was held at 17:00.

References

Diving
European Aquatics Championships